Snezhnogorsky is a rural locality (a settlement) in Snezhnogorsky Selsoviet of Zeysky District, Amur Oblast, Russia. The population was 342 as of 2018. There are 17 streets.

Geography 
Snezhnogorsky is located on the right bank of the Zeya Reservoir, 109 km northeast of Zeya (the district's administrative centre) by road. Zeya is the nearest rural locality.

References 

Rural localities in Zeysky District